Permanent Damage is the fifth and final album by The Icicle Works. The album was released in 1990.

Critical reception
The Quietus called the album a collection of "more straightforward classic rock songs ... an unimaginative set." The Rough Guide to Rock called it a "somewhat desperate set redeemed by the excellent single 'Motorcycle Rider.'" MusicHound Rock: The Essential Album Guide wrote that it tended "to be uninspired and samey."

Track listing
All songs written by Ian McNabb.

"I Still Want You" – 3:35
"Motorcycle Rider" – 3:35
"Melanie Still Hurts" – 4:13
"Hope Street Rag" – 3:28
"I Think I'm Gonna Be OK" – 3:11
"Baby Don't Burn" – 4:07
"What She Did to My Mind" – 7:18
"One Good Eye" – 4:47
"Permanent Damage" – 3:17
"Woman on My Mind" – 3:41
"Looks Like Rain" – 2:12
"Dumb Angel" – 3:32

Personnel
The Icicle Works
Robert Ian McNabb – vocals, guitars, keyboards
Roy Corkhill – bass
Paul Burgess – drums

Additional musicians
Dave Baldwin – additional keyboards
Mark Revell – backing vocals
Ged Lynch – additional drums and percussion
Louis Gardin – percussion

Production
Michael H. Brauer – co-producer on tracks 1-5, mixing on tracks 1-5, 7, 8, 10, 12
Richard Manwaring – co-producer, engineer and mixing on track 6
Mark Phythian – mixing on tracks 9 and 11

References

1990 albums
The Icicle Works albums
Epic Records albums